Washir (also spelt Washer or Washar) is a district in the west of Helmand Province, Afghanistan. Its population was reported in 2012 as 15,200, from the Pashtun ethnic group  believed to be of Noorzai tribe. The district centre is the village of Washir. The district of Washer borders Farah province to the north and is 80 kilometres south of Lashkar Gah.

Residents of Washer district lack basic amenities such as clean drinking water, health clinics, schools and other facilities.

Taliban Insurgency
In June 2011, Afghan National Security Forces (ANSF) recaptured the district from Taliban insurgents during an operation called Operation Afghan Warrior, involving ANA troops from the 215th "Maiwand" Military Corps.  This attack and follow-on sweep ended the four-year reign of the Taliban in the district and installed the rightful district governor to the district center.  The offensive succeeded because of the brave efforts of the Afghan National Army and Afghan National Police working in conjunction with International Security Assistance Force (ISAF) coalition advisors.  Local insurgent fighters had lost local support as a result the Taliban did not put up any resistance.  Efforts continue to make government departments functional to resolve residents' problems within the district.

References

External links

 Map of Settlements AIMS, May 2002

 Operation Afghan Warrior DVIDS, June 2011

See also
Districts of Afghanistan

Districts of Helmand Province